Kilinochchi General Hospital is a government hospital in Kilinochchi, Sri Lanka. It is the leading hospital in Kilinochchi District and is managed by the health ministry northern provincial government.  As of 2010 it had 110 beds. The hospital is sometimes called Kilinochchi District General Hospital.

References

Hospital
Hospitals in Kilinochchi District
Provincial government hospitals in Sri Lanka